Riley Swanson, Jr. (born April 20, 1984 in Atlanta, Georgia) is an American football defensive back who is currently a free agent. He was signed by the Buffalo Bills as an undrafted free agent in 2007. He played college football at Wake Forest. Swanson was on injury reserve with the Rattlers won ArenaBowl XXVI. He is currently the Defensive Coordinator of St. Norbert Football.

References

External links
Arena Football League bio
Arizona Rattlers bio
Wake Forest Demon Deacons bio

1984 births
Living people
Players of American football from Atlanta
American football cornerbacks
American football safeties
Wake Forest Demon Deacons football players
Buffalo Bills players
Arizona Rattlers players
Tampa Bay Storm players